Choi Yeong-gil (born 6 March 1942) is a South Korean wrestler. He competed in the men's freestyle bantamweight at the 1964 Summer Olympics.

References

1942 births
Living people
South Korean male sport wrestlers
Olympic wrestlers of South Korea
Wrestlers at the 1964 Summer Olympics
Place of birth missing (living people)
Asian Games medalists in wrestling
Wrestlers at the 1962 Asian Games
Asian Games bronze medalists for South Korea
Medalists at the 1962 Asian Games
20th-century South Korean people
21st-century South Korean people